is a Japanese voice actor currently working for 81 Produce.

Roles in TV shows 
 Cameraman in 009-1 episode 5
 Agomi, Bar Owner, Scoundrel, and Subordinate B in Gintama
 Worker C in Hataraki Man
 Male Staff B in Kaleido Star
 Interviewer in Karin episode 6
 Kingman in Megaman NT Warrior
 Guard in Pumpkin Scissors
 Benjamin in Zoids: New Century Zero
 The Commanding Officer in Fist of the North Star: Raoh Side Story Junai Arc
 Fist of the North Star: Raoh Side Story Fierce Fighting Arc
 A Seikan Gang Member 2, Customer 3, Bandit, and Assassin 3 in The Story of Saiunkoku
 Raijin, Waraji in Naruto
 Sweden in Hetalia: Axis Powers
 Mammoth in Teen Titans
 Tank Lepanto in One Piece
 Bug-Eaten in Jojo’s Bizarre Adventure

Tokusatsu roles
 Owl Lord / Volucris Ulucus (ep 43 - 44) in Kamen Rider Agito
 Grorzaian HellHeaven (ep 3) in Tokusou Sentai Dekaranger
 Confrontation Beast Crocodile-Fist Niwa (ep 28) in Juken Sentai Gekiranger
 Chameleon Fangire (ep 21 - 22), Bat Fangire Reborn (ep 48) in Kamen Rider Kiva
 Batsu (ep 49 - 50) in Tomica Hero: Rescue Force
 Gyuki (ep 18 - 19) in Kamen Rider Decade
 Doras/Ultimate D in Kamen Rider × Kamen Rider W & Decade: Movie War 2010
 Armored Warrior Inhumanoid (Complete) in Kamen Rider × Kamen Rider OOO & W Featuring Skull: Movie War Core
 Bauzer (ep 9) in Kaizoku Sentai Gokaiger
 Space Spider Man in Kamen Rider × Super Sentai × Space Sheriff: Super Hero Taisen Z

Roles in video games 
 Protectos the Goreroid in Mega Man ZX
 Serizawa Kamo in Bakumatsu Renka Shinsengumi
 Grad in Grand Summoners

Dubbing 
 Sushi Chef in Cars 2

References

External links
 

1972 births
Japanese male video game actors
Japanese male voice actors
Living people
Male voice actors from Fukushima Prefecture
81 Produce voice actors